Mian Kabud-e Qasem (also Romanized as Mīān Kabūd-e Qāsem; also known as Kowkow, Kūkū, and Mīān Kabūd) is a village in Beshiva Pataq Rural District, in the Central District of Sarpol-e Zahab County, Kermanshah Province, Iran. At the 2006 census, its population was 114, in 27 families.

References 

Populated places in Sarpol-e Zahab County